Petri Jaakko Pakaslahti (born January 22, 1976 in Vaasa, Finland) is a Finnish professional ice hockey forward who plays for Södertälje SK.

Pakaslahti is a good defensive center who specializes in faceoffs. He played in the checking line for Team Finland in the 2005 Men's World Ice Hockey Championships, and took defensive zone faceoffs for other lines as well. He also played extensively on penalty kill.

He started his pro hockey career in Lukko in the Finnish SM-liiga, and moved to Jokerit in 2001, where he played to 2007. In summer 2007, he signed a contract with Elitserien team Södertälje SK.

Career statistics

External links

1976 births
Living people
Sportspeople from Vaasa
Finnish ice hockey centres
Jokerit players
Lukko players
Södertälje SK players